Mehlhorn is a surname. Notable people with the surname include:

Annika Mehlhorn, German swimmer
Bill Mehlhorn, American golfer
Hans Mehlhorn, German bobsledder
Herbert Mehlhorn
Kurt Mehlhorn
Ludwig Mehlhorn, German mathematician
Ulf Mehlhorn, German footballer

German-language surnames